Michal Bárta (born October 27, 1987) is a Czech professional ice hockey right winger for HC Kobra Praha of the Czech 2. liga.

Bárta previously played 318 games in the Czech Extraliga for HC Bílí Tygři Liberec, BK Mladá Boleslav and HC Dynamo Pardubice.

References

External links

1987 births
Living people
EHC Bayreuth players
HC Benátky nad Jizerou players
HC Bílí Tygři Liberec players
MKS Cracovia (ice hockey) players
Czech ice hockey right wingers
HC Dynamo Pardubice players
SK Horácká Slavia Třebíč players
HC Kobra Praha players
BK Mladá Boleslav players
Motor České Budějovice players
HC Vrchlabí players
MsHK Žilina players
Sportspeople from Hradec Králové
Czech expatriate sportspeople in Poland
Czech expatriate ice hockey players in Germany
Czech expatriate ice hockey players in Slovakia
Expatriate ice hockey players in Poland